Anaspis rufa is a species of false flower beetle in the family Scraptiidae. It is found in North America.

References

Further reading

External links

 

Scraptiidae
Beetles of North America
Taxa named by Thomas Say
Beetles described in 1826
Articles created by Qbugbot